Glenfield North is a suburb located on the North Shore of the Auckland metropolitan area in New Zealand. The suburb is separated from the Auckland Northern Motorway by the Wairau Park Shopping Complex on the east, from Glenfield by Chivalry Road to the south, from Bayview by Glenfield Road to the west, and from Tōtara Vale by Wairau Road to the north.

Demographics

Glenfield North had a population of 3,333 at the 2018 New Zealand census, an increase of 282 people (9.2%) since the 2013 census, and an increase of 441 people (15.2%) since the 2006 census. There were 1,029 households, comprising 1,689 males and 1,644 females, giving a sex ratio of 1.03 males per female. The median age was 32.7 years (compared with 37.4 years nationally), with 603 people (18.1%) aged under 15 years, 864 (25.9%) aged 15 to 29, 1,560 (46.8%) aged 30 to 64, and 306 (9.2%) aged 65 or older.

Ethnicities were 38.5% European/Pākehā, 6.2% Māori, 4.5% Pacific peoples, 54.3% Asian, and 4.9% other ethnicities. People may identify with more than one ethnicity.

The percentage of people born overseas was 58.2, compared with 27.1% nationally.

Although some people chose not to answer the census's question about religious affiliation, 42.9% had no religion, 38.3% were Christian, 0.3% had Māori religious beliefs, 5.6% were Hindu, 2.1% were Muslim, 3.1% were Buddhist and 2.3% had other religions.

Of those at least 15 years old, 891 (32.6%) people had a bachelor's or higher degree, and 300 (11.0%) people had no formal qualifications. The median income was $34,100, compared with $31,800 nationally. 402 people (14.7%) earned over $70,000 compared to 17.2% nationally. The employment status of those at least 15 was that 1,491 (54.6%) people were employed full-time, 372 (13.6%) were part-time, and 81 (3.0%) were unemployed.

References

Suburbs of Auckland
North Shore, New Zealand
Kaipātiki Local Board Area